Brandon Michael Davis (born May 8, 1990) is an American mixed martial artist who competed in the Bantamweight division of the Ultimate Fighting Championship (UFC).

Background
Davis began training in Brazilian Jiu-Jitsu at the age of 20, while attending Mississippi State University. His first fight came after training just for four months of training.  He later transitioned to mixed martial arts (MMA) and joined Dana White's Contender Series, where he earned his contract with UFC.

Mixed martial arts career

Early career 
Davis fought mostly in the southern region especially his adopted state of Mississippi. He participated in Dana White's Contender Series 4 in 2017 where he won the fight against Austin Arnett and he was signed by UFC. He amassed a record of 8—2, on a seven winning streak of prior joining UFC.

Ultimate Fighting Championship
Davis made his promotion debut on January 20, 2018, facing Kyle Bochniak, at UFC 220.  He lost the fight via unanimous decision.

On February 18, 2018, Davis was scheduled to meet Humberto Bandenay  at UFC Fight Night: Cowboy vs. Medeiros. However, due to visa issue, Bandenay was pulled from the card and was replaced by Steven Peterson.  He won the fight via unanimous decision.  This fight earned him the Fight of the Night award.

His next fight came three months later on May 19, 2018.  He faced Enrique Barzola at UFC Fight Night: Maia vs. Usman. He lost his second UFC fight via unanimous decision.

Davis faced Zabit Magomedsharipov on September 8, 2018 at UFC 228. He lost the fight via submission in the second round.

Davis faced touted newcomer Randy Costa on April 13, 2019 at UFC 236. He won the fight via a rear-naked choke submission in the second round.

Davis faced Kang Kyung-ho on August 17, 2019 at UFC 241. He lost the fight via split decision.

Davis faced promotional newcomer Giga Chikadze on September 28, 2019 at UFC on ESPN+ 18. He lost the fight via split decision. Davis was subsequently released from the UFC.

Post-UFC career
After being released from the UFC, Davis signed with Gulf Coast MMA. He won three fights in a row meanwhile capturing the organization's Bantamweight Championship. In his first title defense attempt, he faced Josh Huber for the Gulf Coast MMA Bantamweight Championship at Gulf Coast MMA 11 on August 14, 2021. He won the fight via first-round knockout.

Return to UFC
Davis faced Danaa Batgerel on October 16, 2021 at UFC Fight Night 195. Davis lost the fight via technical knockout in round one.

Davis faced Leomana Martinez on October 15, 2022 at UFC Fight Night 212. He lost the fight via split decision.

It was annonced in mid January that Davis was released by UFC.

Personal life
Davis earned an Athletic Training degree from Itawamba Community College and a degree in Biological Sciences at Mississippi State University.

Championships and accomplishments
Ultimate Fighting Championship
 Fight of the Night (One time) 
Gulf Coast MMA
Gulf Coast MMA Bantamweight Championship (one time; current)
One successful title defense

Mixed martial arts record

|-
|Loss
|align=center|14–10
|Leomana Martinez
|Decision (split)
|UFC Fight Night: Grasso vs. Araújo
|
|align=center|3
|align=center|5:00
|Las Vegas, Nevada, United States
|
|-
|Loss
|align=center|14–9
|Danaa Batgerel
|TKO (elbows and punches)
|UFC Fight Night: Ladd vs. Dumont
|
|align=center|1
|align=center|2:01
|Las Vegas, Nevada, United States
|
|-
|Win
|align=center|14–8
|Josh Huber
|TKO (body kick and punches)
|Gulf Coast MMA 11
|
|align=center|1
|align=center|1:31
|Biloxi, Mississippi, United States
|
|-
|Win
|align=center|13–8
|Rey Trujillo
|Decision (unanimous)
|Gulf Coast MMA 9
|
|align=center|3
|align=center|5:00
|Biloxi, Mississippi, United States
|
|-
|Win
|align=center|12–8
|Jonathan Eiland
|Submission (rear-naked choke) 
|Gulf Coast MMA 7
|
|align=center|2
|align=center|4:00
|Hattiesburg, Mississippi, United States
|
|-
|Win
|align=center|11–8
|Brad Kelly
|Decision (split)
|Gulf Coast MMA 6
|
|align=center|3
|align=center|5:00
|Hattiesburg, Mississippi, United States
|
|-
|Loss
|align=center|10–8
|Giga Chikadze
|Decision (split)
|UFC Fight Night: Hermansson vs. Cannonier 
|
|align=center|3
|align=center|5:00
|Copenhagen, Denmark
|
|-
|Loss
|align=center|10–7
|Kang Kyung-ho
|Decision (split)
|UFC 241 
|
|align=center|3
|align=center|5:00
|Anaheim, California, United States
| 
|-
|Win
|align=center|10–6
|Randy Costa
|Submission (rear-naked choke) 
|UFC 236 
|
|align=center|2
|align=center|1:12
|Atlanta, Georgia, United States
|
|-
|Loss
|align=center|9–6
|Zabit Magomedsharipov
|Submission (Suloev stretch)
|UFC 228 
|
|align=center|2
|align=center|3:46
|Dallas, Texas, United States
|
|- 
|Loss
|align=center|9–5
|Enrique Barzola
|Decision (unanimous)
|UFC Fight Night: Maia vs. Usman
|
|align=center|3
|align=center|5:00 
|Santiago, Chile
|
|-
|Win
|align=center|9–4
|Steven Peterson
|Decision (unanimous)
|UFC Fight Night: Cowboy vs. Medeiros
|
|align=center|3
|align=center|5:00
|Austin, Texas, United States
|
|-
|Loss
|align=center|8–4
|Kyle Bochniak
|Decision (unanimous)
|UFC 220
|
|align=center|3
|align=center|5:00
|Boston, Massachusetts, United States
|
|-
|Win
|align=center|8–3
|Austin Arnett
|Decision (unanimous)
|Dana White's Contender Series 4
|
|align=center|3
|align=center|5:00
|Las Vegas, Nevada, United States
|
|-
|Win
|align=center|7–3
|Randy Hedderick
|TKO (punches)
|FFI: Blood and Sand 22
|
|align=center|1
|align=center|N/A
|Biloxi, Mississippi, United States
|
|-
|Win
|align=center|6–3
|Max Mustaki
|Decision (unanimous)
|Island Fights 40
|
|align=center|3
|align=center|5:00
|Pensacola, Florida, United States
|
|-
|Win
|align=center|5–3
|Latral Perdue
|Submission (guillotine choke)
|Summit FC
|
|align=center|1
|align=center|0:42
|Tupelo, Mississippi, United States
|
|-
|Loss
|align=center|4–3
|Dawond Pickney
|Decision (Split)
|Summit FC Jackson
|
|align=center|3
|align=center|5:00
|Jackson, Mississippi, United States
|
|-
|Win
|align=center|4–2
|Thomas Vasquez
|Decision (unanimous)
|Summit FC 15
|
|align=center|3
|align=center|5:00
|Tupelo, Mississippi, United States
|
|-
|Win
|align=center|3–2
|Adam Denton
|TKO (punches)
|Summit FC 14
|
|align=center|N/A
|align=center|N/A
|Tupelo, Mississippi, United States
|
|-
|Win
|align=center|2–2
|Lawrence Purifoy
|Submission (choke)
|Summit FC 13
|
|align=center|N/A
|align=center|N/A
|Jackson, Mississippi, United States
|
|-
|Loss
|align=center|1–2
|Jesse Sanderson
|Decision (unanimous)
|Summit FC 11
|
|align=center|3
|align=center| 5:00
|Tupelo, Mississippi, United States
|
|-
|Loss
|align=center|1–1
|Jorge Medina
|Submission (rear-naked choke)
|Summit FC 8
|
|align=center|2
|align=center|3:11
|Vicksburg, Mississippi, United States
|
|-
|Win
|align=center|1–0
|Brandon Pemberton
|TKO (punches)
|Summit FC 5
|
|align=center|1
|align=center|N/A
|Southaven, Mississippi, United States
|
|-

See also

 List of male mixed martial artists

References

External links
 
 

1990 births
Sportspeople from Atlanta
Living people
Featherweight mixed martial artists
Mixed martial artists utilizing Muay Thai
Mixed martial artists utilizing Brazilian jiu-jitsu
American male mixed martial artists
Mixed martial artists from California
Mississippi State University alumni
Ultimate Fighting Championship male fighters
American practitioners of Brazilian jiu-jitsu
American Muay Thai practitioners